Newlight Technologies is a company based in Irvine, California known for carbon sequestration into plastics.

History and corporate affairs
As of October 2020, Newlight Technologies has one facility located in Huntington Beach, California, which serves as its headquarters, R&D, operations, and manufacturing facility.

Technology
Currently, Newlight captures methane from a dairy farm in California. The methane is transported to a bioreactor. From there, the methane is mixed with air and interacts with enzymes to form a polymer trademarked as AirCarbon. According to Popular Science, the plastic performs similarly to most oil-based plastics but costs less to produce. AirCarbon has already been contracted for use in desk chairs, computer packaging, and smart phone cases.

Recognition
In 2013, AirCarbon was named the bio-material of the year by the International Conference on Bio-based Plastics and Composites. In 2014, AirCarbon was named Popular Science's Innovation of the Year.

References

Carbon capture and storage
Technology companies based in Greater Los Angeles
Companies based in Irvine, California
Renewable resource companies established in 2003
Technology companies established in 2003
2003 establishments in California
Methane
American companies established in 2003